Cylindrepomus is a genus of longhorn beetles of the subfamily Lamiinae, containing the following species:

 Cylindrepomus albicornis Nonfried, 1894
 Cylindrepomus albomaculatus Breuning, 1947
 Cylindrepomus albopictus Breuning, 1938
 Cylindrepomus albosignatus Breuning, 1947
 Cylindrepomus albovittatus Breuning, 1960
 Cylindrepomus astyochus Dillon & Dillon, 1948
 Cylindrepomus atropos Dillon & Dillon, 1948
 Cylindrepomus aureolineatus Dillon & Dillon, 1948
 Cylindrepomus ballerioi Vitali, 2000
 Cylindrepomus bayanii Hüdepohl, 1987
 Cylindrepomus biconjunctus Breuning, 1940
 Cylindrepomus bilineatus Schwarzer, 1926
 Cylindrepomus bivitticollis Breuning, 1947
 Cylindrepomus bivittipennis Breuning, 1955
 Cylindrepomus cicindeloides Schwarzer, 1926
 Cylindrepomus comis Pascoe, 1858
 Cylindrepomus cyaneus Pic, 1924
 Cylindrepomus elisabethae Hüdepohl, 1987
 Cylindrepomus filiformis Breuning, 1938
 Cylindrepomus flavicollis Breuning, 1947
 Cylindrepomus flavipennis Breuning, 1947
 Cylindrepomus flavosignatus Breuning, 1947
 Cylindrepomus flavus Breuning, 1947
 Cylindrepomus fouqueti (Pic, 1932)
 Cylindrepomus grammicus Pascoe, 1860
 Cylindrepomus hayashi Hüdepohl, 1987
 Cylindrepomus javanicus Breuning, 1936
 Cylindrepomus laetus Pascoe, 1858
 Cylindrepomus malaccensis Breuning, 1936
 Cylindrepomus mantiformis Hüdepohl, 1989
 Cylindrepomus mucronatus Schwarzer, 1926
 Cylindrepomus nigriceps Franz, 1971
 Cylindrepomus nigrofasciatus Blanchard, 1853
 Cylindrepomus peregrinus Pascoe, 1858
 Cylindrepomus rubriceps (Aurivillius, 1907)
 Cylindrepomus rufofemoratus Breuning, 1947
 Cylindrepomus sexlineatus Schultze, 1934
 Cylindrepomus sexplagiatus Breuning, 1936
 Cylindrepomus spinosus Hüdepohl, 1990
 Cylindrepomus uniformis Breuning, 1938
 Cylindrepomus viridipennis (Pic, 1937)
 Cylindrepomus vittatus (Pic, 1925)
 Cylindrepomus ysmaeli Hüdepohl, 1987

References

Dorcaschematini
Cerambycidae genera